Henry C. Leventis (born August 5, 1974) is an American lawyer who is the United States attorney for the Middle District of Tennessee.

Early life and education

Leventis was born on August 5, 1974, in Houston. He received a Bachelor of Arts from the College of Charleston in 1997 and a Juris Doctor from Washington and Lee University School of Law in 2003.

Legal career

From 2003 to 2005 and again from 2008 to 2010, Leventis served as assistant solicitor in the Ninth Circuit Solicitor's office in Charleston, South Carolina. From 2005 to 2007, he was as an associate with Motley Rice, LLC. From 2010 to 2015, he served as a trial attorney in the Criminal Section of the Civil Rights Division of the United States Department of Justice. From 2015 to 2020, Leventis served as an assistant United States attorney in the United States Attorney's Office for the Middle District of Tennessee. Since 2020, he has been a partner at the law firm Spencer Fane LLP.

Nomination as U.S. attorney 

On July 29, 2022, President Joe Biden announced his intent to nominate Leventis to be the United States Attorney for the Middle District of Tennessee. On August 1, 2022 his nomination was sent to the United States Senate. On December 8, 2022, his nomination was reported out of committee by a voice vote, with Senator Josh Hawley voting "nay" on record. On December 15, 2022, the Senate confirmed his nomination by voice vote.

References

1974 births
Living people
21st-century American lawyers
Assistant United States Attorneys
College of Charleston alumni
People from Houston
South Carolina lawyers
Tennessee lawyers
United States Attorneys for the Middle District of Tennessee
United States Department of Justice lawyers
Washington and Lee University School of Law alumni